Jill Reiss Harper (born 1972) is an American molecular biologist and policy advisor serving as the deputy director for science management and executive officer at the National Institute of Allergy and Infectious Diseases.

Education 
Harper earned a B.S. in biology with a minor in chemistry from Oglethorpe University in 1994. She was on the volleyball team for 4 years. She completed a M.A. and a Ph.D. in molecular biology from Princeton University. Her 2001 dissertation was titled The role of periplasmic protein folding factors in escherichia coli. Thomas J. Silhavy was Harper's doctoral advisor. She was an American Society for Microbiology congressional science fellow. As a fellow starting in September 2001, Harper spent a year as a legislative assistant in a U.S. Representative’s office, where she worked on issues related to science and technology and bioterrorism.

Career 
Harper joined National Institute of Allergy and Infectious Diseases (NIAID) in 2002. She served as the chief of the legislative affairs and correspondence management branch, in the NIAID office of communications and government relations, where she led congressional liaison and legislative analysis activities for NIAID. Harper was later the director of the NIAID office of biodefense research and surety (OBRS), where she led the National Institutes of Health (NIH) chemical countermeasures research program and coordinated surety functions, including emergency preparedness, physical and personnel security, and biosurety, across the institute. Harper served as the associate director for science management at NIAID. She is now the NIAID deputy director for science management. In this position, Harper provides leadership for scientific, policy, business, and administrative management of the Institute and conducts senior-level interactions with the extramural community, other NIH components, and the NIH Office of the Director. She also serves as the executive officer of NIAID.

Selected works

References 

Living people
Place of birth missing (living people)
American women biologists
Women molecular biologists
American molecular biologists
21st-century American biologists
21st-century American women scientists
Oglethorpe University alumni
Princeton University alumni
National Institutes of Health people
1972 births